Dennis Kirkland (2 December 1942 – 16 February 2006) was an English television producer and director best known for his long association with comedian Benny Hill.

Early life and career 
Born in North Shields, Northumberland, England, Kirkland started out as a child actor, appearing in television advertisements that aired on the then-new Independent Television upon its start-up in the 1950s.  He then went behind-the-scenes, first as a property master for Tyne Tees Television, and then on to short stints with the Windmill Theatre and Royal Opera House in London. Later he was hired by Associated TeleVision as a floor manager, where he worked at the time Benny Hill hosted some TV programmes for ATV in 1967.

Career 
In 1968, Kirkland joined Thames Television as a floor manager, before becoming a warm-up man on The Benny Hill Show. He then moved up the ranks, directing children's shows such as Rainbow and The Tomorrow People, as well as a sketch comedy show called What's on Next?  Finally, in 1979 Kirkland was named producer/director of The Benny Hill Show, remaining in those positions for the remainder of its run at Thames. During this period, he also worked with top comics including Tommy Cooper, Ken Dodd, Jim Davidson and Eric Sykes, whose 1979 remake of The Plank (directed by Sykes and produced by Kirkland) won at the Montreux TV Festival.  But it was with Hill that Kirkland became best known. It was also during his run with the Hill show that the programme first became dogged by charges of sexism however, in no small part due to the addition of the dancing and singing troupe Hill's Angels on his watch, and after years of steadily declining ratings and rising production costs, Thames cancelled the Hill show in 1989; not long afterward, Kirkland's association with the company ended as well.

Kirkland continued to work with Hill, directing a TV special in 1990 with outdoor scenes taped in New York, and was to direct a new Hill series for Central Independent Television when Hill died in 1992. Central went ahead with the show anyway, directed by Kirkland and fronted by Freddie Starr. Critics panned it calling it "The Benny Hill Show without Benny." In 1993, he published a memoir about his friendship with Hill, Benny: The True Story, re-released in 2002 as The Strange and Saucy World of Benny Hill.  He continued to work in television in Britain and Ireland until his death.

Personal life 
Kirkland was married twice and had two sons and a daughter, the actress Joanna Kirkland.

Death 
Kirkland was admitted to hospital in London in January 2006 because of a low sodium count and died shortly thereafter at the age of 63.

External links

 Obituary at The Independent
 Obituary at The Stage
 Dennis Kirkland tribute page at Benny's Place

1942 births
2006 deaths
British television directors
British television producers
People from North Shields
Television people from London
20th-century British businesspeople